Sentry Mountain is a  summit located in the Canadian Rockies of Alberta, Canada.

Description

Sentry Mountain is situated 10 kilometers west-southwest of the town of Coleman in the Crowsnest Pass area and can be seen from Highway 3, the Crowsnest Highway, which traverses the northern base of the mountain. It is the northernmost peak of the Flathead Range and is set on land managed by Castle Wildland Provincial Park. Precipitation runoff from the mountain drains into headwaters of the Crowsnest River. Topographic relief is significant as the summit rises 1,080 meters (3,543 feet) above Crowsnest Lake in 1.5 kilometer (0.9 mile).

History

Sentry Mountain was originally named "Sentinel Mountain", but was changed in 1915 to avoid confusion with another by the same name. The mountain's toponym was officially adopted in 1924 by the Geographical Names Board of Canada.

Geology
Sentry Mountain is composed of sedimentary rock laid down during the Precambrian to Jurassic periods. Formed in shallow seas, this sedimentary rock was pushed east and over the top of younger Cretaceous period rock during the Laramide orogeny.

Climate
Based on the Köppen climate classification, Sentry Mountain has an alpine subarctic climate with cold, snowy winters, and mild summers. Temperatures can drop below −20 °C with wind chill factors below −30 °C.

Gallery

See also
Geology of Alberta

Further reading
 Scrambles in the Canadian Rockies by Alan Kane

References

External links

 Sentry Mountain weather forecast
 Climbing Ostracized Peak & Sentry Mountain (photos): explor8ion.com

Two-thousanders of Alberta
Canadian Rockies
Crowsnest Pass, Alberta